This list is of the Places of Scenic Beauty of Japan located within the Prefecture of Hiroshima.

National Places of Scenic Beauty
As of 1 August 2014, nine sites have been designated at a national level (including two *Special Places of Scenic Beauty).

Prefectural Places of Scenic Beauty
As of 1 May 2014, seven sites have been designated at a prefectural level.

Municipal Places of Scenic Beauty
As of 1 May 2014, sixteen sites have been designated at a municipal level.

See also
 Cultural Properties of Japan
 List of Historic Sites of Japan (Hiroshima)
 List of parks and gardens of Hiroshima Prefecture

References

External links
  Cultural Properties of Hiroshima Prefecture

Tourist attractions in Hiroshima Prefecture
Places of Scenic Beauty